Frank Marion Thomas (July 13, 1889 – November 25, 1989) was an American character actor of stage, screen and television. He and his wife, actress Mona Bruns, both lived to 100 years old. He died the day before her 90th birthday; she died 11 years later. Their son was Frankie Thomas.

Biography
Thomas' parents were Jesse and Virginia Thomas. He first appeared on Broadway in 1914. Thomas also played many supporting roles in films from the 1930s through the 1970s. His best-known films were We Who Are About To Die (1937), A Man to Remember (1938), A Shot In the Dark (1941), Desert Trail (1942), and No Place for a Lady (1943). His last screen appearance was in The Killing of a Chinese Bookie (1976).

He performed frequently on television from the 1950s to the 1970s. He was president (Shepherd) of The Lambs (1962–63). His film appearances were so prolific at one point in his career that, in 1937 alone, he appeared in 21 films.

Filmography

(Per AFI database)

 Nearly Married  (1917) as Harry Lindsey
 Deadline at Eleven  (1920) as Jack Rawson
 Wednesday's Child  (1934) as Attorney for the Defense (as Frank Thomas Sr.) 
 M'liss  (1936)
 The Big Game  (1936)
 The Ex-Mrs. Bradford  (1936)
 Don't Turn 'Em Loose  (1936)
 Mummy's Boys  (1936)
 Grand Jury  (1936)
 The Last Outlaw  (1936)
 Without Orders  (1936)
 Wanted! Jane Turner  (1936)
 Behind the Headlines  (1937)
 Breakfast for Two  (1937)
 The Toast of New York  (1937)
 Forty Naughty Girls  (1937)
 Danger Patrol  (1937)
 We're on the Jury  (1937)
 The Man Who Found Himself  (1937)
 Don't Tell the Wife  (1937)
 We Who Are About to Die  (1937) 
 Criminal Lawyer  (1937)
 Quick Money  (1937)
 Racing Lady  (1937)
 The Outcasts of Poker Flat  (1937)
 You Can't Buy Luck  (1937)
 They Wanted to Marry  (1937)
 The Soldier and the Lady  (1937) 
 You Can't Beat Love  (1937)
 High Flyers  (1937)
 Meet the Missus  (1937)
 The Big Shot  (1937)
 China Passage  (1937)
 The Renegade Ranger  (1938)
 Maid's Night Out  (1938)
 Night Spot  (1938)
 Joy of Living  (1938)
 Crashing Hollywood  (1938)
 Vivacious Lady  (1938)
 Blind Alibi  (1938)
 Go Chase Yourself  (1938)
 Everybody's Doing It  (1938)
 Crime Ring  (1938)
 Mr. Doodle Kicks Off  (1938)
 Law of the Underworld  (1938)
 The Saint in New York  (1938)
 Smashing the Rackets  (1938)
 This Marriage Business  (1938)
 Bringing Up Baby (1938)
 A Man to Remember  (1938)
 Strange Faces  (1938)
 Disbarred  (1939)
 The Rookie Cop  (1939)
 They Made Her a Spy  (1939)
 Saga of Death Valley  (1939)
 Death of a Champion  (1939)
 Society Lawyer  (1939)
 Bachelor Mother  (1939)
 They All Come Out  (1939)
 Secret Service of the Air  (1939) 
 Scandal Sheet  (1939)
 Mr. Smith Goes to Washington  (1939) as Hendricks (uncredited)
 The Mysterious Miss X  (1939)
 Grand Jury Secrets  (1939)
 $1,000 a Touchdown  (1939)
 Burn 'Em Up O'Connor  (1939)
 Beware Spooks! (1939)
 Geronimo  (1939)
 Lillian Russell  (1940)
 Brigham Young - Frontiersman  (1940)
 Chad Hanna  (1940)
 Maryland  (1940) 
 Women Without Names  (1940)
 High School  (1940)
 The Man from Dakota  (1940)
 City of Chance  (1940)
 Shooting High  (1940)
 Queen of the Mob  (1940)
 Among the Living  (1941)
 Arkansas Judge  (1941)
 Dangerously They Live  (1941)
 Life with Henry  (1941)
 Man at Large  (1941)
 The Monster and the Girl  (1941)
 A Shot in the Dark  (1941)
 Sierra Sue  (1941)
 Three Sons o' Guns  (1941)
 Wyoming Wildcat  (1941)
 Apache Trail  (1942)
 A Desperate Chance for Ellery Queen  (1942)
 Eyes in the Night  (1942)
 Flight Lieutenant  (1942)
 The Great Man's Lady  (1942)
 Henry Aldrich, Editor  (1942)
 Obliging Young Lady  (1942)
 The Postman Didn't Ring  (1942)
 Reap the Wild Wind  (1942)
 Sunset on the Desert  (1942)
 Sunset Serenade  (1942)
 The Talk of the Town  (1942)
 Wild Bill Hickok Rides  (1942)
 Flight for Freedom  (1943)
 Hello Frisco, Hello  (1943)
 Mountain Rhythm  (1943)
 No Place for a Lady  (1943)
 The Desert Song  (1944)
 The Story of Kenneth W. Randall, M.D. (1946)
 The Sleeping City  (1950)

References

External links

 
 
 

1889 births
1989 deaths
Male actors from Missouri
People from St. Joseph, Missouri
American male silent film actors
American male stage actors
American centenarians
The Lambs presidents
20th-century American male actors
Men centenarians